The Bank of England Act 1709 (8 Ann c 1) was an Act of the Parliament of Great Britain. It was one of the Bank of England Acts 1694 to 1892.

Only the title of this Act is printed in Ruffhead's Edition.

The Bank of England Act 1709, except the last two sections, was repealed by section 1 of, and the Schedule to, the Statute Law Revision Act 1867.

The whole Act was repealed by section 3(4) of, and Schedule 3 to, the Bank of England Act 1946.

References

Halsbury's Statutes,

Great Britain Acts of Parliament 1709
Bank of England
Repealed Great Britain Acts of Parliament
Banking legislation in the United Kingdom
1709 in economics
Banking in Great Britain